David McCord Lippincott (17 June 1924 – January 1984) was an American composer, lyricist and novelist.

Education
David McCord Lippincott wrote music and lyrics from an early age. The first evidence of that is a musical revue he wrote while attending the Hotchkiss School called "Little Boy Blue". He then went to Yale University, as did his father; was a member of Skull & Bones, as was his father William Jackson Lippincott. He graduated in 1949.

Work
After college, Lippincott worked for McCann Erickson as a creative director, writing copy and creating jingles.  His original album musical, The Body in the Seine has become a collector's item.

During this time, he also wrote books, several of which are still available. Some of the writings were turned into films.

Bibliography 

 E Pluribus Bang! (1970)
 The Voice of Armageddon (1974)
 Tremor Violet (1975)
 The Blood of October (1978)
 Savage Ransom (1978)
 Salt Mine (1979)
 Dark Prism (1980). Published as Black Prism in the UK.
 Unholy Mourning (1982)
 The Nursery (1983)
 The Home (1984)

References

External links
 The Music of David Lippincott

1924 births
American male composers
1984 deaths
Hotchkiss School alumni
Yale University alumni
20th-century American composers
20th-century American writers
20th-century American male writers
20th-century American male musicians